The University of the Philippines Singing Ambassadors, also known as the UP Singing Ambassadors or UPSA, is one of the major performing musical groups based at the University of the Philippines Diliman (UP-Diliman) in Quezon City, Philippines. UPSA is the State University's official performing group for choreographed choral music and resident choir of the UP College of Arts and Letters. The UPSA has performed music from different styles: classical music, international songs, spirituals, ethnic, Broadway, pop, jazz, gospel, inspirational songs and rock. As ambassadors of Philippine culture, the UPSA incorporates cultural dances, costumes and traditions from various regions in the Philippines as part of its repertoire.

The UPSA has won numerous accolades and citations, locally and internationally, including a slot at the 2002 European Choral Grand Prix.

Brief history 
The UPSA was initially formed as the Kalayaan Choral Crowd, a freshman dormitory choir of the Kalayaan Residence Hall at the University of the Philippines' Diliman campus. It was later reorganized as the University of the Philippines Singing Ambassadors in 1980.

Edgardo Manguiat, winner of the Dirigentenpreis (Conductor's Award) in the 2nd Johannes Brahms Int’l. Choir Competition in Germany, is the Founder and Conductor of The U.P. Singing Ambassadors (UPSA). He was a former member of the University of the Philippines Concert Chorus (UPCC). 

As a member of the International Federation of Choral Music (IFCM), Ed attended the 1st and the 4th World Symposia on Choral Music in Vienna, Austria and Sydney, Australia, respectively. Here, Ed attended Choral workshops and master classes under world-renowned choral musicians like Sweden‘s Eric Ericsson.

As a student at the U.P. College of Music, he studied vocal pedagogy under Aurelio Estanislao, Fides Cuyugan-Asencio, Andrea Veneracion and Elmo Makil; and choral conducting under Rey T. Pagiuo, Elmo Makil, Flora Rivera, and Joel Navarro.

Ed has served as Vocal Coach and Consultant of several NAMCYA 1st prize winners like the 3-time national winner Loboc Children's Choir of Bohol. Ed composes and does choral arrangements. His most recent works include one of the themes in the internationally acclaimed film Magnifico.

His outstanding achievements earned him the pride of his own hometown as he received the Golden Achievers Award during the 50th Anniversary Celebration of Lipa City in 1997, and the Most Outstanding Lipeño in the Field of Music in 1993.

Awards 
Like two other UP-based choirs (namely, the Philippine Madrigal Singers (the Madz) and the UP Concert Chorus (UPCC)), the UPSA has gained national prominence through its participation in international choral competitions.

Winning the Gran Premio Città at the Concorso Polifonico Internazionale Guido d'Arezzo in Italy in 2001 (thus far the only Asian choir winning the award), the UPSA was eligible to compete as one of the finalists in the 14th European Grand Prix of Choral Singing in 2002. Together with the Madz, the UST Singers and the Ateneo Glee Club, the UPSA is one of only four Filipino choirs who were eligible to compete in the European Choral Grand Prix.

The UPSA is the 2002 & 2010 ALIW Awardee for Best Choral Group, the Most Outstanding University Choir in the 2004 Who's Who in the Philippines Consumer's Choice Awards and the Philippine entry to the UNESCO International Music Prize 2005 held in Paris, France. The choir recently celebrated its 30th anniversary by conducting its 7th European Tour and holding a grand reunion concert at the Cultural Center of the Philippines on August 27, 2010. 

The UPSA also has the distinction of being the only choir that has won three awards in the 51-year history of the Certamen internacional de Habaneras y Polifonia de Torrevieja in Torrevieja, Spain. This competition was also participated in by the Philippine Madridal Singers a year before UPSA joined the competition.

In the 2008 European Tour, the UP Singing Ambassadors brought home twelve awards from prestigious choral competitions in France, Hungary, Poland, Switzerland and Wales in the United Kingdom. The awards include two grand prizes, seven 1st prizes, three 3rd prizes plus five grand prize qualifications. 

In addition, the UPSA has also won awards at choral competitions in Trencianske Teplice in Slovakia and Prague, the Czech Republic (grand prize); in Wernigerode, Germany (first prize); Neuchâtel, Switzerland; Maasmechelen, Belgium; Cantonigros in Spain; Gorizia, Italy; Arnhem, The Netherlands; Pardubice, Czech Republic; Varna, Bulgaria; and Tours, France.

Gretchen Espina, the first Pinoy Idol is also a member of the UP Singing Ambassadors.

Appearances 
The UPSA has performed at various cities in the Philippines and abroad. To date, they have performed in Austria, Australia, Bulgaria, Czech Republic, Denmark, Egypt, France, Germany, Great Britain, Hong Kong, Hungary, Italy, Israel, South Korea, Luxembourg, United Arab Emirates, Singapore, Spain, Switzerland, Taiwan, Thailand, The Netherlands and the USA.

In addition, the UPSA also participated in the following activities:
 acted as back-up chorus to international and local performers like Josh Groban in his AWAKE World Tour concert at the Philippine International Convention Center in 2007, Lani Misalucha at the 2007 Metro Manila Film Festival Awards Night in the SMX Convention Center, Kuh Ledesma and Vernie Varga in Sing For Me: The GMA Christmas Choir Festival at the Marikina Sports Park, Regine Velasquez in her 20th Anniversary concert at the Araneta Coliseum in 2006 and Wofgang's Acoustica concert at the Music Museum in 2000, to name a few;
 being the only Asian participant in the 2005 Arezzo Sbandieratori Medieval Feast in Italy;
 participation in the 13th Festival International de Chant Choral de Nancy in France, where UPSA earned accolades and received standing ovations in all of its performances;
 performance before French President Jacques Chirac and other VIP's and diplomats in the American Church in Paris, France, for the memory of the September 11 Twin Towers Attack victims; This was aired live via CNN. Simultaneously broadcast with other major activities happening around the world for the victim of the tragedy.
 performance in the Sydney Opera House to drum-up activities for the 2000 Sydney Olympic Games;
 participation in Mabuhay Philippines showcasing Filipino culture in choral music, painting and "haute couture" in Taiwan, Hong Kong, Egypt and the United Arab Emirates in 1993 - 1994
 participation in the Office of the President-Presidential Management Staff (Philippines) 2008 Christmas Party Celebrations

References

External links 
 UP Singing Ambassadors - the official website
 The University of the Philippines Singing Ambassadors - Resident Choir of the University of the Philippines College of Arts and Letters
 UP Singing Ambassadors bring home 12 awards - from Wikinoypi. Collection of news items that highlights Filipino achievements around the world.
 GMA News video clip of UPSA's arrival at the Ninoy Aquino International Airport, Manila

Filipino choirs
Philippines Singing Ambassadors
Musical groups established in 1980